Stewart Hall is a historic library and administration building associated with the West Virginia University and located at Morgantown, Monongalia County, West Virginia. It was built between 1900 and 1902, and consists of a gabled central block, a 2 1/2 story gabled entrance pavilion, and a monumental octagonal tower. It is built of reinforced concrete and coursed Amherst sandstone blocks and is in the Romanesque Revival style. The interior features a two-story, arcaded rotunda. It housed the university library until 1931, when it became the Administration Building.  It was renamed in the 1970s in honor of Irvin Stewart, president of the University from 1946 to 1958.

It was listed on the National Register of Historic Places in 1980.

References

Library buildings completed in 1902
West Virginia University campus
Libraries on the National Register of Historic Places in West Virginia
Romanesque Revival architecture in West Virginia
University and college buildings on the National Register of Historic Places in West Virginia
National Register of Historic Places in Monongalia County, West Virginia